Chahar Bot (also Romanized as Chahār Bot; also known as Chahār Būt) is a village in Oshnavieh-ye Jonubi Rural District, Nalus District, Oshnavieh County, West Azerbaijan Province, Iran. At the 2006 census, its population was 165, in 27 families.

References 

Populated places in Oshnavieh County